Young European Socialists (YES), formerly the European Community Organisation of Socialist Youth (ECOSY), is an association of social democratic youth organisations in Europe and the European Union.

YES is the youth organisation of the Party of European Socialists (PES) and is a sister organization of the International Union of Socialist Youth (IUSY). The seat of the organisation is Brussels.

Full members status is held to the European Youth Forum (YFJ) which operates within the Council of Europe and European Union areas and works closely with both these bodies.

History 
YES was founded as the European Community Organisation of Socialist Youth (ECOSY) in November 1992 in Oegstgeest/The Hague. The preparatory committee consisted of Philip Cordery (MJS, France), Joris Jurriëns (JS-PvdA, Netherlands), Jens Geier (Jusos, Germany), Giustina Magistretti (Italy), and Pascal Smet (Belgium).

Before 1992 the European activities had been coordinated inside IUSY, especially in the European Leaders Meeting. The foundation of ECOSY had been controversial. In particular, the Austrians and the Swedes promoted an all-European organisation, including non-EU members.

The European Socialist Youth (ESY), founded in parallel, was only a weak organisation, a short time later renamed the European Committee, one of the IUSY continental committees.

The organisation's name was changed to Young European Socialists (YES) at the 11th Congress in Bommersvik in 2013.

Affiliated organisations

Full members
  — Forum of Eurosocialist Youth of Albania (FRESSH) also Youth Movement for Integration (LRI)
  — Հայկական Երիտասարդաց Դաշնակցութիւն (ՀԵԴ)
  — Sozialistische Jugend Österreich (SJÖ)
  — Verband Sozialistischer StudentInnen Österreichs (VSStÖ)
  — Jongsocialisten
  — Mouvement des Jeunes Socialistes (MJS)
  — Forum Mladih SDP / Social Democratic Youth (SDY)
  — Европейска лява младежка алтернатива (ЕЛМА) / European Left Youth Alternative (ELYA)
  — Младежко Обединение БСП (МБСП) / BSP Youth Union (BSPYU)
  — SDP Youth Forum (FM SDP)
  — EDEK Youth
  — Republican Turkish Party (CTP) Youth
  — Mladí Sociální Demokraté (MSD)
  — Danmarks Socialdemokratiske Ungdom (DSU)
  — Social Democratic Youth (SDY)
  — Social Democratic Youth (SDY)
  — Sosialidemokraattiset Opiskelijat (SONK)
  — Mouvement des Jeunes Socialistes (MJS)
  — Jusos in der SPD
  — Sozialistische Jugend Deutschlands – Die Falken (SJD-Die Falken)
  — PASOK Youth
  — Societas – Young Left
  — Ungir Jafnaðarmenn (UJ)
  — Labour Youth
  — Giovani Democratici (GD)
  — Federazione dei Giovani Socialisti (FGS)
  — Jauniešu organizācija Restart.lv
  — Jaunatnes Sociāldemokrātiskā Savienība (JSS)
  — Lithuanian Social Democratic Youth Union (LSDYU)
  — Jeunesses Socialistes Luxembourgeoises (JSL)
  — Forum Zghazagh Laburisti (FZL)
  — Youth Council of Democratic party of socialists (YCDPS)
  — Jonge Socialisten in de PvdA (JS)
  — Social Democratic Youth (SDY)
  — Federacja Młodych Socjaldemokratów (FMS)
  — Juventude Socialista (JS)
  — Tineretul Social Democrat (TSD)
  — Democratic Youth (DY)
  — Social Democratic Youth (SDY)
  — League of Social Democrats of Vojvodina Youth (LSVO)
  — Mladí sociálni demokrati (MSD)
  — Mladi forum Socialnih demokratov (Mladi forum SD)
  — Joventut Socialista de Catalunya (JSC)
  — Juventudes Socialistas de España (JSE)
  — Sveriges Socialdemokratiska Ungdomsförbund (SSU)
  — Socialdemokratiska Studentförbundet (SSF)
  — JungsozialistInnen Schweiz / Jeunesse socialiste suisse / Gioventù Socialista Svizzera (JUSO/JS/GS)
  — CHP Gençlik Kolları
  — Labour Students
  — Young Labour
  (Northern Ireland) — SDLP Youth
  — Young Fabians (YF)

Observers
Beside these 50 full member organisations there are 14 observer members

  — Youth Movement for Integration (LRI)
  — Маладыя сацыял-дэмакраты - Маладая Грамада (МСД-МГ) / (MSD-MH)
  — Αγώνας / Agonas
  — Egyptian Social Democratic Party (ESDP) Youth
  — Young Socialists Georgia (YSG)
  — המשמרת הצעירה של מפלגת העבודה / Mishmeret Tse’irah shel Mifleget haAwoda (Young Labour)
  — Young Meretz, Meretz Youth
  — South Tyrolean European Democratic Youth (STEDY)
  — Progressive Youth Organization (PYO)
  — Arbeidernes ungdomsfylking (AUF)
  — Fatah Youth
  — Российский социал-демократический союз молодёжи (РСДСМ) / Russian Social-Democratic Union of Youth (RSDYU)
  — Giovani Socialisti e Democratici (GSD)
  — Jeunes Socialistes Démocrates (JSD)
  — Union of Young Socialists (SMS)

Presidents 
Since the founding of ECOSY in 1992 until 1997, the presidency rotated simultaneously with the EU Presidency
1992 Tracy Paul (Young Labour)
1993 Henrik Sass Larsen (Danmarks Socialdemokratiske Ungdom)
1993 Ronald Gossiaux (Mouvement des Jeunes Socialistes / Belgium)
1994 Vasilis Togias (Neolaia Pasok)
1994 Reinhold Rünker (Jusos in der SPD)
1995 Renaud Lagrave (Mouvement des Jeunes Socialistes)
1995 Martin Guillermo (Juventudes Socialistas de España)
1995 Paco-Luis Benitez (Juventudes Socialistas de España)
1996 Vinicio Peluffo (Sinistra Giovanile)
1996 Mick McLoughlin (Labour Youth)
1997 Thomas Windmulder (Jonge Socialisten in de PvdA)

Afterwards, ECOSY has an elected president
1997–1999 Andreas Schieder (Sozialistische Jugend Österreich)
1999–2001 Hugues Nancy (Mouvement des Jeunes Socialistes)
2001–2003 Jan Krims (Verband Sozialistischer StudentInnen Österreichs)
2003–2005 Anders Lindberg (Sveriges Socialdemokratiska Ungdomsförbund)
2005–2009 Giacomo Filibeck (Sinistra Giovanile)
2009–2011 Petroula Nteledimou (Neolaia PASOK)
2011–2015 Kaisa Penny (Demarinuoret & SONK)
2015–2017 Laura Slimani (Mouvement des Jeunes Socialistes)
2017–2019 Joao Albuquerque (Juventude Socialista)
Since 2019 Alicia Homs (Juventudes Socialistas de España)

Secretaries General 

1992–1997 Philip Cordery (Mouvement des Jeunes Socialistes / France)
1997–1999 Pau Solanilla (Juventudes Socialistas de España)
1999–2003 Yonnec Polet (Mouvement des Jeunes Socialistes / Belgium)
2003–2005 Ilias Antoniou (Neolaia Pasok)
2005–2009 Ania Skrzypek (Federacja Młodych Socjaldemokratów)
2009–2011 Janna Besamusca (Jonge Socialisten in de PvdA)
2011–2015 Thomas Maes (Jongsocialisten; ex Animo)
2015–2017 Nina Živanović (SDY in SDU)
2017–2019 Tuulia Pitkänen (Sosialidemokraattiset Nuoret / Finland)
2019–2020 Maj Christensen Jensen (Danmarks Socialdemokratiske Ungdom)
Since 2020 Ana Pirtskhalava (Young Socialists Georgia)

Congresses 

1992 Oegstgeest/The Hague
1994 Munich
1997 Strasbourg
1999 Toledo
2001 Vienna
2003 Bommersvik (Sweden)
2005 Cascais (Portugal)
2007 Warsaw
2009 Brussels
2011 Bucharest
2013 Bommersvik (Sweden)
2015 Winterthur
2017 Duisburg
2019 Helsinki

Summer camps 

1995 Rimini (Italy)
1996 Iusy Festival Bonn
1997 Mazagón (Spain)
1998 Vienna (Austria)
1999 Livorno (Italy)
2000 Iusy Festival Malmö
2001 Debrecen (Hungary)
2002 Weißenbach (Austria)
2003 Iusy Festival Kamena Vourla (Greece)
2004 Năvodari (Romania)
2005 Figueira da Foz (Portugal)
2006 Iusy Festival Alicante
2007 Iusy100 Berlin
2008 Carpentras (France)
2009 Iusy Festival Zánka (Hungary)
2011 Iusy Festival Weißenbach (Austria)
2012 Savudrija (Croatia) The Declaration
2013 Foça (Turkey)
2014 Iusy Festival Ghajn Tuffieha (Malta)
2015 Santa Cruz (Torres Vedras) (Portugal)
2016 Palermo (Italy)
2018 Rota (Spain)
2019 Varna (Bulgaria)

References

External links 

Official website

Organisations based in Brussels
Party of European Socialists
Progressive Alliance
Youth wings of pan-European political parties
Youth wings of social democratic parties